Headquarters House, also known as the Colonel Tebbetts place, is a historic house museum at 118 East Dickson Street in Fayetteville, Arkansas.  Built in 1850, it saw action in the American Civil War, serving as a headquarters for both the Union and Confederacy. During the action at Fayetteville, the house was attacked by Confederate troops while serving as a Union outpost. The building was donated to the Washington County Historical Society as a museum in 1967 and was placed on the National Register of Historic Places in 1971.

History
The house was constructed by Judge Jonas Tebbetts and his wife in the Greek Revival architectural style. It was completed by 1853. This beautiful home would come to play a significant role during the Civil War.  Many of the residents of Fayetteville supported the South.  However, Judge Tebbetts was an outspoken supporter of the Union.  He was arrested in March 1862. Tebbetts was taken to Fort Smith by Confederate General Benjamin McCulloch.  Tebbetts was released at the time of General McCulloch's death which occurred during the Battle of Pea Ridge. Tebbetts fled to Fayetteville where he learned of a price on his head.  He and his family quickly evacuated to Missouri leaving their beloved home.  That was the last time the Tebbetts Family inhabited the home. After the Tebbetts house was abandoned, the Union Army took it over and used it for their Headquarters.

Action at Fayetteville

The Headquarters House was the intended target of a Confederate attack on April 18, 1863. Union forces were using the house as a base for their northwest Arkansas operations. With a successful capture of the Headquarters House the Rebels could sweep the Union from northwest Arkansas.

The Rebels attacked at 6:00 am in east Fayetteville, drawing fire while artillery climbed East Mountain and fired into the city. One cannonball struck the front door of the Headquarters House, and the house sustained substantial damage throughout the battle. The Union rallied and began to push the Confederates out of Fayetteville later in the morning. Despite a desperate charge up Dickson Street, the Confederates finally decided they could not take the Headquarters House and withdrew. The door and cannonball remain and are now displayed within the museum.

Architecture

The Headquarters House exhibits many key characteristics of Greek Revival architecture. The porch's fluted columns and dentil trimmed eaves are common in similar structures. The parlor fireplace is also typical of Greek Revival style.

See also

 Action at Fayetteville
 National Register of Historic Places listings in Washington County, Arkansas

References

External links
 Washington County Historical Society

1850 establishments in Arkansas
American Civil War on the National Register of Historic Places
Georgian architecture in Arkansas
Greek Revival houses in Arkansas
Historic house museums in Arkansas
Houses completed in 1850
Houses in Fayetteville, Arkansas
Museums in Washington County, Arkansas
National Register of Historic Places in Fayetteville, Arkansas
Tourist attractions in Fayetteville, Arkansas